Martin Klink (born 25 September 1940) is a retired German swimmer who won a bronze medal at the 1962 European Aquatics Championships. He also competed at the 1964 Summer Olympics but was eliminated in preliminaries.

References

1940 births
East German male swimmers
Swimmers at the 1964 Summer Olympics
Olympic swimmers of the United Team of Germany
Living people
European Aquatics Championships medalists in swimming
People from Apolda
Sportspeople from Thuringia